Whisper If I Forget is a 2014 Turkish drama film directed by Çağan Irmak.

Cast 
 Farah Zeynep Abdullah - Hatice (Ayperi)
 Mehmet Günsür - Tarik
 Kerem Bürsin - Erhan
 Hümeyra - Ayperi (older)
 Isil Yücesoy - Hanife (older)
 Gözde Cigaci - Hanife
 Gürkan Uygun - Kemal
 Köksal Engür - Erhan (older)

References

External links 

2014 drama films
Turkish drama films